Jammed Lovely (foaled 1964 in Ontario) was a Canadian Champion and Hall of Fame Thoroughbred racehorse who won the 1967 Queen's Plate, Canada's most prestigious race and North America's oldest annually run stakes race.

Bred and raced by Conn Smythe, owner of the NHL hockey team the Toronto Maple Leafs, Jammed Lovely was trained by future Canadian Horse Racing Hall of Fame inductee Yonnie Starr. At age two, she earned Canadian Champion Two-Year-Old Filly honours after winning five races including an eleven-length win in both the Natalma Stakes on turf and the Mazarine Stakes on dirt.

Racing at age three, Jammed Lovely ran second on a sloppy track in the 1967 Canadian Oaks, Canada's most prestigious race for fillies of her age group. She then defeated a field of males in winning the Queen's Plate.

After she retired to broodmare duty, the most successful runners of Jammed Lovely's offspring was the multiple stakes winner Lovely Sunrise.

In 2007, Jammed Lovely was inducted into the Canadian Horse Racing Hall of Fame.

References
 Jammed Lovely's pedigree and partial racing stats
 June 25, 1967 New York Times article on Jammed Lovely's win in the Queen's Plate
 Jammed Lovely at the Canadian Horse Racing Hall of Fame

1964 racehorse births
Racehorses bred in Ontario
Racehorses trained in Canada
King's Plate winners
Canadian Horse Racing Hall of Fame inductees
Thoroughbred family 23-a